Raj Mukherji is a State Assemblyman in the New Jersey Legislature, who was first elected in 2013 and represents the 33rd Legislative District. Since 2022, he serves in the Assembly as Deputy Speaker and formerly served as Majority Whip of the New Jersey General Assembly. He is also a lawyer, former healthcare and information technology CEO, former Deputy Mayor of Jersey City, former municipal prosecutor, and political science professor. Mukherji was reelected in 2015, 2017, 2019, and 2021, most recently by a 4-to-1 margin. In February 2022, following the adoption of a new 10-year legislative map by the New Jersey Legislative Apportionment Commission, Mukherji announced his candidacy for an open seat in the New Jersey Senate in a reconfigured 32nd Legislative District and was rapidly endorsed by local and statewide officials such as New Jersey Governor Phil Murphy and Jersey City Mayor Steven Fulop. He is a former U.S. Marine Corps sergeant who enlisted two weeks following the September 11th terrorist attacks. Mukherji serves as Chairman of the Assembly Judiciary Committee and Vice Chairman of the Assembly Appropriations Committee. He previously served as Vice Chair of the Assembly Telecommunications and Utilities Committee.

Mukherji started multiple successful businesses before completing his teenage years and was sworn into his first public office at age 24.

At 28, Mukherji - as a running-mate of longtime State Senator Brian P. Stack - won a six-way Democratic primary election for the Assembly by a 36-point margin in 2013 and won the November general election by a 20-point margin, becoming the second South Asian legislator in state history (after Upendra J. Chivukula). In 2016 and 2017, Mukherji was identified by POLITICO as the most prolific lawmaker in the state because of his primary sponsorship of more bills signed into law than any other legislator.

The 33rd district includes the Hudson County municipalities of Hoboken, Jersey City, Union City and Weehawken. It is the most densely populated legislative district in the state. Mukherji's newly drawn 32nd legislative district, as of January 2024, will comprise Hoboken and Jersey City.

Early life, education, and career

Mukherji is the son of Indian American immigrants who arrived from Calcutta in 1970. According to news accounts, he supported himself through high school, college, and grad school as an emancipated minor when economic circumstances forced his parents to return to their native India. After suffering a pituitary tumor, stroke, and other ailments, Mukherji's father – an accountant and musician – could no longer work as a result of his health but could not afford health coverage without employment.

Labeled a "wunderkind" by the media, Mukherji was previously the CEO of an Internet consulting and software development company that he founded while in the sixth grade. Mukherji later sold the company to a federal contractor to enlist in the Marines two weeks after the September 11 attacks at age 17, where he served as a reservist in military intelligence. The young entrepreneur withdrew from high school at 15 to enroll in an early college program at Bard College at Simon's Rock, eventually earning his bachelor's degree from Thomas A. Edison State University. He also holds a masters from the University of Pennsylvania and a Juris Doctor, cum laude, from Seton Hall Law School, and he has performed on Broadway and in motion pictures, as a member of the Screen Actors Guild (SAG).

Mukherji cofounded and led as CEO companies that achieved an aggregate half billion dollars in enterprise value, spanning healthcare, information technology, medical cannabis, and real estate. At 19, he had cofounded a public affairs firm that he grew into the state's third largest lawyer-lobbying firm, reportedly through his ties to New Jersey Democratic establishments and the Obama administration. In 2011, he was named an annual "Legends" honoree by the Hudson County Chamber of Commerce.

Prior public service
At 24, Mukherji was appointed by the Mayor of Jersey City and confirmed by the City Council to replace Lori Serrano (who had been removed and was later charged with corruption) as the youngest Commissioner and Chairman to ever serve on the Jersey City Housing Authority, the state's second largest public housing authority and a $70 million agency serving over 16,000 residents and over 6,700 households. During Mukherji's tenure, the JCHA was applauded by HUD for attaining the highest score for Section 8 management among similar agencies in the state. The agency was also showered with federal grants and aid from the Obama administration, which dispatched then-U.S. Secretary of HUD Shaun Donovan to Jersey City on multiple occasions to announce tens of millions in competitive federal grants the agency had won.

At 27, Mukherji was tapped to fill a vacancy as Deputy Mayor of Jersey City, New Jersey, the state's second largest city with a $500 million operating budget. According to The Jersey Journal, while Deputy Mayor, Mukherji declined the $110,056 salary and a city-issued car, instead opting to earn one dollar per year due to "the austere economic climate."

Mukherji was previously appointed by then-U.S. Senator Jon Corzine to his Military Academy Board in 2003. In 2004, Governor Jim McGreevey appointed him to the Governor's Council on Volunteerism and Community Service. He was also a Superior Court-appointed member of the Juvenile Conference Committee.

Legislative career
In the Assembly, Mukherji has been a primary sponsor of dozens of bills that passed both houses and were signed into law, including:
Enacting a comprehensive, bipartisan overhaul of the state's outdated and ineffective bail system and expanding legal aid for low-income New Jerseyans;
Combating the state's heroin, opiate, and prescription drug addiction epidemic by requiring physicians and pharmacists to access the state's Prescription Monitoring Program to prevent "doctor shopping;"
Making New Jersey the first state in the United States to enact a ban on ivory commerce (in an effort to thwart profits for poachers and wildlife traffickers and to protect elephants and other endangered or threatened species), which effort garnered public support for Mukherji's ivory ban legislation by actress Meryl Streep and musician Billy Joel and inspired similar prohibitions in other states;
Legislation expanding the state's Drug Court programs and creating a substance abuse recovery housing program at NJ's four-year public colleges and universities with on-campus housing in order to provide a supportive substance-free dormitory environment that recognizes the unique risks and challenges faced by recovering students, along with other legislation expanding access to mental health and substance abuse treatment and recovery services;
Repealing prohibitions on sports betting in New Jersey to help Atlantic City's gaming industry rebound;
"The Parkinson's Disease Public Awareness and Education Act," a first-in-the-nation law dedicating resources to create a public education and outreach campaign for Parkinson's disease diagnosis and treatment, inspiring a similar effort in Kansas;
Combating bedbugs by requiring sanitation, protective, and labeling procedures in the sale of used mattresses and boxsprings;
Legislation improving prison addiction recovery programs (allowing certain drug treatment programs to operate in state and county jails) to help break the cycle of recidivism;
Creating criminal penalties for fatal hit-and-run boating accidents;
Improving the state's higher education system, develop an advanced cyberinfrastructure plan, and initiate a Big Data consortium; and
Securing state infrastructure investments for his home county of Hudson.

Committees 
Committee assignments for the current session are:
Judiciary, Chair
Appropriations, Vice-Chair
Budget
Joint State Leasing and Space Utilization Committee

District 33 
Each of the 40 districts in the New Jersey Legislature has one representative in the New Jersey Senate and two members in the New Jersey General Assembly. The representatives from the 33rd District for the 2022—23 Legislative Session are:
 Senator Brian P. Stack  (D)
 Assemblywoman Annette Chaparro  (D)
 Assemblyman Raj Mukherji  (D)

Controversy
Mukherji became embroiled in controversy when he was tapped to be the new Chairman of the Jersey City Housing Authority. Amidst his nomination, critics opposed the Housing Authority's plans to demolish and redevelop a six-tower 549-unit public housing project known as Montgomery Gardens. Later, while under Mukherji's leadership, the agency came under fire for its strict "One-Strike" eviction policy, enabled by federal legislation enacted under President Clinton, allowing housing authorities to evict entire households where a resident is charged with a serious crime (without being convicted). While defending the legislation, Mukherji convened public hearings prior to ordering an overhaul of the One-Strike policy, telling Jersey City Independent that the policy had "served as a deterrent and important tool to reduce drug-related and violent criminal activity in public housing (...but) certain revisions may be appropriate to ensure an equitable policy and eviction process... We want to be fair and equitable to criminal defendants, as the presumption of innocence must be sacrosanct, while being mindful that our foremost responsibility is to do all that we can to keep our tenants safe."

As a teenager, Mukherji pleaded guilty to a misdemeanor charge of possession of a fake identification in 2004 that was used for underage drinking.

See also

 Indian Americans in New Jersey

References

External links
Legislative webpage, New Jersey Legislature
Assemblyman Raj Mukherji’s political website
Raj Mukherji’s legislative page at Assembly Democrats

1984 births
American politicians of Indian descent
Asian-American people in New Jersey politics
Bengali politicians
Living people
Democratic Party members of the New Jersey General Assembly
Politicians from Jersey City, New Jersey
Seton Hall University School of Law alumni
Thomas Edison State University alumni
United States Marines
United States Marine Corps reservists
University of Pennsylvania alumni
21st-century American politicians